Sveti Ožbalt may refer to several places in Slovenia: 

Ožbalt, a settlement in the Municipality of Podvelka, known as Sveti Ožbalt until 1952
Podgaj, Šentjur, a settlement in the Municipality of Šentjur, known as Sveti Ožbalt until 1955